Puerto Rico Highway 110 (PR-110) is a road that goes from Añasco, Puerto Rico to Aguadilla through Moca. It extends from Puerto Rico Highway 2 north of Añasco to Ramey Air Force Base.

Major intersections

Related routes
Currently, PR-110 has two branches in its old segments in Aguadilla and Moca and it also has another one between the two municipalities.

Puerto Rico Highway 110R

Puerto Rico Highway 110R (abbreviated Ramal PR-110 or PR-110R) was the old section of PR-110 through downtown Moca. This road can be seen as a Business 110, but currently is renumbered to PR-4025.

Puerto Rico Highway 4010

Puerto Rico Highway 4010 (PR-4010) is an old segment of PR-110 that provides access to a small residential area between Aguacate and Maleza Alta in Aguadilla. Previously it was identified as PR-110R.

Puerto Rico Highway 4110

Puerto Rico Highway 4110 (PR-4110) is a spur route of PR-110 between Moca and Aguadilla. It extends from PR-110 to PR-443.

See also

 List of highways numbered 110

References

External links

 DTOP anuncia cierre por emergencia de la PR-110 entre Aguada a Moca 

110